Derek Robertson RSW SSA SAA  (born 1967) is a Scottish artist. One of the signature members of the Society of Animal Artists, he is known for his paintings of wildlife and landscapes, and for his poetic narrative work consisting of paintings, constructions and installations. He has been elected several times on the Council of the RSW and has written and presented 5 television programs about his work and the wildlife he portrays and has written 5 books about his art: The Mugdrum, Highland Sketchbook, A Studio Under The Sky, Otters, An Artist's Sketchbook, "Living Landscapes" and Puffins: An Artist's Sketchbook. His work has also illustrated many other publications.

Life and work
Derek Robertson was born near St Andrews, Fife, Scotland . While at the High School of Dundee he attended weekend art classes by James MacIntosh Patrick before completing a BA (Hons) in drawing and painting at Duncan of Jordanstone College of Art, Dundee. On graduating in 1989 he was commissioned by HarperCollins to write and illustrate his first book, "Highland Sketchbook" which was nominated for the McVities Prize. He was then commissioned by Grampian Television to present a program about his work for the series "Portrait of The Wild". He went on to write and present a series of four, half-hour programs for Grampian TV/STV entitled "Drawn From Wild Places". He has won several awards, including the RSW Small Painting Prize, Glasgow Art Club Fellowship and John Gray Award. He has illustrated many publications, most notably "Song of The Rolling Earth" and "Nature's Child" by the nature writer Sir John Lister-Kaye. He exhibits mainly in the UK, but also overseas and his work is held in public and private collections internationally. His wildlife work is noted for his use of outdoor sketching from life and for often using the unusual technique of watercolour on linen. He has served on the selection and hanging committees for a number of the exhibiting societies in Scotland and on the council of the Aberdeen Artists Society. He has worked on collaborative projects with the poets Valerie Gillies and Rody Gorman. as well as being appointed Artist in Residence at Tentsmuir Nature Reserve and working on numerous collaborative projects with scientists and other creative practitioners.

Wildlife research
Derek Robertson is an amateur wildlife researcher. He is a licensed bird ringer and has assisted many research projects which have resulted in co-authored publications including a collaborative research project on farmland finches with the BTO. His own studies have also been published in scientific papers and he has illustrated and edited a number of papers and publications including the Fife Bird Atlas. He has accompanied research expeditions to Africa and Scandinavia and to seabird islands such as St Kilda, the Shiant Isles and Handa Island which have all featured in his paintings. He has served on many research and conservation committees including the Isle of May Bird Observatory, the Tay Ringing Group, and the BTO council and ringing committee.

References

Further reading
 Describes Derek Robertson is never happier than when painting in the great outdoors. Exhibition review.
 Describes Derek Robertson's latest book is a beautifully produced, limited edition that portrays a personal and intimate view of creatures in the wild. Review.
 Describes Gillian Zealand meets wildlife artist Derek Robertson. Review.
 Describes A Year In Glen Esk
 Describes Paintings and sketches by the artist.
 Describes book. Paintings and observations of otters.
 Describes book. Illustrated by the artist.
 Book Illustrated by the artist
 Book. Images of grouse. Paintings and writing by the artist.
 Book. Illustrations by the artist.
 Description: review by editor of Wildscape magazine describing artist's working technique.
 Description: exhibition review

External links
"Interview: Derek Robertson is never happier than when painting in the great outdoors", The Scotsman, 15 August 2008. Retrieved 2012-02-27.
Wildlife and landscapes
Narrative paintings and constructions

20th-century Scottish painters
People educated at the High School of Dundee
Alumni of the University of Dundee
Scottish male painters
21st-century Scottish painters
21st-century Scottish male artists
Scottish illustrators
Living people
1967 births
20th-century Scottish male artists